Harold Despard Twigg (April 5, 1876 – November 12, 1946) was an Irish-born lawyer, life insurance agent and political figure in British Columbia. He represented Victoria City in the Legislative Assembly of British Columbia from 1924 to 1933 as a Conservative.

He was born in Dungannon, County Tyrone, the son of William Twigg and the former Miss Smith, and came to Canada in 1899. He was called to the British Columbia bar in 1903 and set up practice in Victoria. In 1911, Twigg married Marguerite J. Little. Twigg served in the Canadian Expeditionary Force during World War I, achieving the rank of captain. He was a director for the Victoria Chamber of Commerce. He died in Victoria at the age of 70.

References 

1876 births
1946 deaths
British Columbia Conservative Party MLAs
Irish emigrants to Canada (before 1923)